The men's 4 × 100 metres relay event at the 1970 British Commonwealth Games was held on 25 July at the Meadowbank Stadium in Edinburgh, Scotland. It was the first time that the metric distance was contested at the Games replacing the 4 × 110 yards relay.

Medalists

Results

Heats
Qualification: First 4 teams of each heat (Q) qualified directly for the final.

Final

References

Heats & Final results (The Sydney Morning Herald) (p10)

Athletics at the 1970 British Commonwealth Games
1970